Prof. Daniel Thalmann is a Swiss and Canadian computer scientist and a pioneer in Virtual humans. He is currently Honorary Professor at EPFL, Switzerland  and Director of Research Development at MIRALab Sarl in Geneva, Switzerland.

Biography 
After a master's degree in Nuclear Physics (1970) and a combined Certificate in Statistics and Computer Science (1972) both from the University of Geneva, he earned a PhD in Computer Science (1977) also from the University of Geneva. In his PhD, he worked very early on the concept of abstract machines for portable compilers and operating systems. From 1977 to 1989, he was Professor at the University of Montreal, in Canada, where he started to work on computer graphics and animation.  Then, he came back to Switzerland and founded the virtual reality lab (VRlab) at EPFL, Switzerland. He has been Visiting Professor/ Researcher at CERN, University of Nebraska-Lincoln, University of Tokyo, and National University of Singapore. From 2009 to 2017, he was Visiting Professor at the Institute for Media Innovation, Nanyang Technological University, Singapore. He is co-editor-in-chief of the Journal of Computer Animation and Virtual Worlds, and member of the editorial board of six other journals. Thalmann has published more than 650 papers in graphics, animation, and virtual reality. He is coeditor of 30 books, and coauthor of several books including Crowd Simulation (second edition 2012) and Stepping Into Virtual Reality (2007), published by Springer.

Research 
In the 1980s, Thalmann together with Nadia Magnenat Thalmann became interested in the realistic computer modelling and rendering of the human form, in motion. In 1988, they directed the short film Rendez-vous in Montreal, which is widely regarded as the first computer film to employ synthetic actors, in this case Humphrey Bogart and Marilyn Monroe.

In the 1990s, Thalmann focused his research on behavioural animation of Virtual Humans, introducing the concept of synthetic vision for autonomous virtual humans, and developing methods for realistic gait modelling. In the late 1990s, he launched the first project on crowd simulation of virtual humans, initiating a new field of animation that now attracts many researchers. Rendering of tens of thousands of agents, collision detection and generation of varieties of individual people became important issues. He also introduced, with Marcelo Kallmann, the concept of smart objects as objects that describe their own possible interactions. He recently extended his research from virtual humans to social robots, working in the team on Nadine Social Robot.

Thalmann is also recognized in the area of Virtual Rehabilitation, a term he coined with Professor Grigore Burdea of Rutgers University (US). He has also created with him the International Conference on Virtual Rehabilitation and is a founder of the International Society of Virtual Rehabilitation.

Awards and honors 

Thalmann received an Honorary Doctorate (Honoris Causa) from Paul-Sabatier University in Toulouse, France, in 2003. He also received the Eurographics Distinguished Career Award in 2010 and the 2012 Canadian Human Computer Communications Society Achievement Award. In 2015, he received the CGI Career Achievement Award from the Computer Graphics Society (CGS).

References

External links 
 List of publications at EPFL
 List of publications at Google Scholar
 Homepage and CV at EPFL

Films/Demos 
 Nadia Magnenat Thalmann, Daniel Thalmann, Rendez-vous a Montreal, 1987
 Jonathan Maim, Barbara Maim, Daniel Thalmann, Crowd Simulation, 2006
 Helena Grillon, Daniel Thalmann, Attention Crowds, 2007
 EPFL VRLab demos, YouTube Channel

Computer graphics researchers
Canadian computer scientists
Computer graphics professionals
Swiss computer scientists
Living people
Place of birth missing (living people)
University of Geneva alumni
People associated with CERN
1946 births